Sobradinho Esporte Clube, commonly known as Sobradinho, is a Brazilian football team, based in city of Sobradinho, in the Distrito Federal. They competed in the Série A once, in the Série B four times and in the Série C once. The club was known as Botafogo Sobradinho Esporte Clube for a short time.

Sobradinho is the fourth-best ranked team from the Federal District in CBF's national club ranking, at 179th overall.

History
The club was founded on January 1, 1975. They won the Campeonato Brasiliense in 1985, and in 1986. Sobradinho competed in the Série B in 1985, when they were eliminated in the First Stage by Americano. The club competed in the Série B in 1986, qualifying to compete in that year's Série A, when they were eliminated in the Second Stage. They competed again in the Série B in 1987, when they were eliminated in the First Stage. Sobradinho was eliminated in the First Stage in the Série B in 1989. They competed in the Série C in 1996, when they were eliminated in the Second Round by Mixto. The club joined a partnership with Botafogo de Futebol e Regatas on March 1, 1996, thus being renamed to Botafogo Sobradinho Esporte Clube. After a few years, the partnership ended, and the club was renamed back to Sobradinho Esporte Clube. Sobradinho won the Campeonato Brasiliense Second Level in 2003.

Honours

 Campeonato Brasiliense:
 Winners (3): 1985, 1986, 2018
 Campeonato Brasiliense Second Level:
 Winners (1): 2003

Stadium
Sobradinho Esporte Clube play their home games at Augustinho Pires de Lima. The stadium has a maximum capacity of 15,000 people.

References

 
Association football clubs established in 1975
Football clubs in Federal District (Brazil)
1975 establishments in Brazil